The 1996–97 Moldovan "A" Division season is the 6th since its establishment. A total of 16 teams are contesting the league.

League table

Tiras Soroca and Gloria Edineț withdrew after the winter break, their records were expunged:

Promotion/relegation play-off
25 June 1997
Agro Chișinău 5–2 Raut Orhei
Codru Călărași 1–2  Stimold-MIF Chișinău

Codru relegated, Stimold-MIF promoted.

References
 Moldova. Second Level 1996/97 - RSSSF

External links
 "A" Division - moldova.sports.md

Moldovan Liga 1 seasons
2
Moldova